Kilimanoor Assembly Constituency was a constituency of the Kerala Legislative Assembly. It consisted of Pazhayakunnummel  Pulimath, Kilimanoor Grama Panchayath, Nagaroor, Madavoor, Pallickal, Karavaram, Mudakkal and Navaikulam Panchayats. Adv. N. Rajan was the last representative of this constituency from 2001 to 2006.

Members of the Legislative Assembly

References

External links
 

Former assembly constituencies of Kerala